The St. Charles Historic District  is a national historic district located at St. Charles, St. Charles County, Missouri.  It is the site of the first permanent European settlement on the Missouri River and of the embarkation of Lewis and Clark's journey of exploration along the Missouri. The first state capital of Missouri and over one hundred other historic buildings are located in the district.

The district was listed on the National Register of Historic Places in 1970, including 63 contributing buildings over a  area. The district was later increased three times.

The original listing included the separately NRHP-listed First Missouri State Capitol Buildings and the Newbill-McElhiney House. In 1987 the district was increased to include a Greek Revival specialty store building at 1000 S. Main Street, with a  area. This included the St. Charles Odd Fellows Hall, the Old City Hall, a post office, and other buildings in Late 19th and 20th Century Revivals, Greek Revival, and Late Victorian architectural styles.

These include Greek Revival, Italianate, and Late 19th and 20th Century Revivals architecture, including work by architects Albert B. Groves and Frank & Adolph Haverkamp.

References

External links
Historic Main Street, City of St. Charles, Missouri.
Video: First Missouri State Capitol State Historic Site, (3:32), Modrnmedia

Geography of St. Charles County, Missouri
Greek Revival architecture in Missouri
Victorian architecture in Missouri
Italianate architecture in Missouri
Historic districts on the National Register of Historic Places in Missouri
National Register of Historic Places in St. Charles County, Missouri